UFC Fight Night: Magomedsharipov vs. Kattar (also known as UFC Fight Night: Zabit vs. Kattar, UFC Fight Night 163 and UFC on ESPN+ 21) was a mixed martial arts event produced by the Ultimate Fighting Championship that took place on November 9, 2019 at CSKA Arena in Moscow, Russia.

Background
A heavyweight bout between former UFC Heavyweight Champion Junior dos Santos and former Bellator Heavyweight Champion Alexander Volkov was scheduled to serve as the event headliner. However, dos Santos pulled out of the matchup on October 22, citing a bacterial infection in his leg. Greg Hardy was announced as the replacement on the same day, moving this bout down into the co-main event slot.

A featherweight bout between Zabit Magomedsharipov and Calvin Kattar was scheduled for UFC on ESPN: Reyes vs. Weidman. However, promotion officials then elected to instead reschedule the pairing for this event. In turn, after a change up in participants in the original main event, the pairing was elevated to serve as the three round headliner.

Vinc Pichel was linked to a bout with Alexander Yakovlev at the event. However, Pichel pulled out of the fight on October 24, citing an undisclosed injury and was replaced by Roosevelt Roberts.

A light heavyweight bout between Gadzhimurad Antigulov and Ed Herman was scheduled for the event. However, Antigulov was pulled from the bout for an undisclosed reason and replaced by Khadis Ibragimov.

Results

Bonus awards
The following fighters received $50,000 bonuses.
Fight of the Night: Zabit Magomedsharipov vs. Calvin Kattar
Performance of the Night: Magomed Ankalaev and David Zawada

See also 

 List of UFC events
 2019 in UFC
 List of current UFC fighters

References 

UFC Fight Night
2019 in mixed martial arts
Mixed martial arts in Russia
Sports competitions in Moscow
2019 in Russian sport